A microchip or integrated circuit is a set of electronic components on a single unit.

Microchip implant (animal), a microchip implanted into animals
Microchip implant (human), a microchip implanted into a human being

Microchip can also refer to:
Microchip Technology, a company that makes 8, 16 and 32-bit microcontroller lines
Microchip (comics), a supporting character in the Punisher comics
Micro Chips, a Mexican children's rock band

See also
Microprocessor
Silicon chip
Integrated circuit